This is the complete list of Olympic medalists in biathlon.

Medalists in military patrol, a precursor to biathlon, are listed separately.

Men
The numbers in brackets denotes biathletes who won gold medal in corresponding disciplines more than one time. Bold numbers denotes record number of victories in certain disciplines.

Individual (20 km)

Medals

Sprint (10 km)

Medals

Pursuit (12.5 km)

Medals

Mass start (15 km)

Medals

Relay (4×7.5 km)

Medals

Women
The numbers in brackets denotes biathletes who won gold medal in corresponding disciplines more than one time. Bold numbers denotes record number of victories in certain disciplines.

Individual (15 km)

Medals

Sprint (7.5 km)

Medals

Pursuit (10 km)

Medals

Mass start (12.5 km)

Medals

Relay (4×6 km)
The women's relay event has been competed over three different distances:
 3×7.5 km — 1992
 4×7.5 km — 1994–2002
 4×6 km — 2006–2018

Medals

Mixed

Relay

Medals

Statistics

Medal table

Note
 This table includes 1924 military patrol medals.

Biathlete medal leaders

Men

Women

* denotes all Olympics in which mentioned biathletes took part. Boldface denotes latest Olympics.

Biathletes with most victories

Top 10 biathletes who won more gold medals at the Winter Olympics are listed below. Boldface denotes active biathletes and highest medal count among all biathletes (including those not in the tables) per type.

Men

Women

* denotes only those Olympics at which mentioned biathletes won at least one medal

Medals per year

 bolded numbers indicate the highest medal count at that year's Olympic Games.

See also
Biathlon World Championships
Biathlon World Cup
List of IOC country codes
Military patrol at the 1924 Winter Olympics

References
International Olympic Committee results database

Biathlon
medalists
 
Olympic